A Flat, G Flat and C is an album by American jazz multi-instrumentalist Yusef Lateef, featuring performances recorded in 1966 for the Impulse! label.

Reception

The Allmusic review by Scott Yanow stated:

Track listing

Personnel
Yusef Lateef – tenor saxophone, alto saxophone, flute, oboe, chuen, theremin
Hugh Lawson – piano
Reggie Workman – bass
Roy Brooks – drums

References

Impulse! Records albums
Yusef Lateef albums
1966 albums
Albums recorded at Van Gelder Studio
Albums produced by Bob Thiele